The 2021 Mobile mayoral election was held on August 24, 2021, to elect the mayor of Mobile, Alabama. Incumbent Republican mayor Sandy Stimpson was re-elected to a third term.

Candidates

Declared 
 Donavette Ely, candidate for mayor in 2017
 Karlos Finley, municipal judge (Party affiliation: Democratic)
 Fred Richardson, city councillor (Party affiliation: Democratic)
 Sandy Stimpson, incumbent mayor (Party affiliation: Republican)
 Michael Young, co-founder of the Gulf Coast Mental Health Coalition

Results

References

External links 
Official campaign websites
 Donavette Ely for Mayor
 Karlos Finley (D) for Mayor 
 Fred Richardson (D) for Mayor
 Sandy Stimpson (R) for Mayor
 Michael Young for Mayor 

Mobile
Mobile mayoral
Mayoral elections in Mobile, Alabama